Twentyfour Income Fund is a large British investment trust. Established in 2013, it is dedicated to investing in less liquid, higher yield investments. The chairman is Trevor Ash. It is listed on the London Stock Exchange and it is a constituent of the FTSE 250 Index. It is managed by Twentyfour, which is part of the Vontobel Group.

In March 2022, the company announced that it would merge with UK Mortgages in a transaction worth £700 million. The transaction will result in UK Mortgages being wound up.

References

External links
 Official site

Investment trusts of the United Kingdom